The Georgia Peaches (also known as Follow That Car) is a 1980 American made-for-television action-adventure comedy film produced by Roger Corman as a pilot for a proposed television series. It starred Tanya Tucker, Terri Nunn and Dirk Benedict as three friends extorted into becoming undercover FBI agents for the government and was broadcast on CBS on November 8, 1980.

Plot
The exploits of two sisters – Lorette Peach (Tucker), a country-western singer and Sue Lynn Peach (Nunn), owner of the Georgia Peaches Garage, and Dusty Tyree (Benedict), a stock car racer – as three friends recruited as undercover agents by the U.S. Treasury Department. In the pilot, they attempt to break up a ring of cigarette bootleggers operating out of their home state of Georgia.

Cast
 Tanya Tucker as Lorette Peach
 Terri Nunn as Sue Lynn Peach
 Dirk Benedict as "Dusty" Tyree
 Lane Smith as Randolph Dukane
 Sally Kirkland as Vivian Stark
 Dennis Patrick as Wade Holt
David Hayward as Joe Don Carter
 Burton Gilliam as Delbert Huggins
 Noble Willingham as Jarvis Wheeler

Home media
The Georgia Peaches was released on DVD by Shout! Factory as part of "Roger Corman's Cult Classics" Triple Feature Action-Packed Collection series on April 5, 2011.

References

External links

1980 television films
1980 films
1980s action comedy films
American action comedy films
1980s exploitation films
1980s chase films
New World Pictures films
Films directed by Daniel Haller
Films produced by Roger Corman
CBS network films
Television films as pilots
Films shot in South Carolina
Films set in Georgia (U.S. state)
American exploitation films
American chase films
1980 comedy films
1980s English-language films
1980s American films